

References

2012 PDC Pro Tour